Zagrishinskoye is a rural locality (a village) in Khokhlovskoye Rural Settlement, Permsky District, Perm Krai, Russia. The population was 28 as of 2010. There are 3 streets.

Geography 
Zagrishinskoye is located 42 km north of Perm (the district's administrative centre) by road. Skobelevka is the nearest rural locality.

References 

Rural localities in Permsky District